A shoulder strap is a strap over a shoulder. They are often affixed to women's dresses to support its weight or as part of its style. The term is also applied to carrying bags.

Dress shoulder strap

Dress shoulder straps are a length of fabric, usually in pairs, used to support clothing, especially women's clothing, such as a dress, camisole, apron or brassiere. Shoulder straps such as these are usually made of the same material as the garment, and may be quite flimsy, as they are normally not expected to support much weight.

The shoulder straps on some dresses may be very thin, in which case they may be called a spaghetti strap (also called "noodle strap"). These are common in clothing such as camisoles, cocktail dresses, and evening gowns.

Some institutions ban spaghetti strap dresses and bare-shoulder strapless dresses on grounds of modesty.

Military shoulder strap 

Many military uniform shirts, jackets, tunics, or greatcoats feature shoulder straps. They were originally designed to keep back packs, ammunition pouches or bayonets from slipping off the shoulder. They often display badges of rank, shoulder marks, regimental insignia or epaulettes.

Carrier shoulder strap

A carrier shoulder strap is a length of fabric or other flexible material (such as leather, vinyl, rubber), used to suspend an item, often of some weight, from the shoulder(s). The strap may be worn slung over one shoulder or across the body. In the interest of comfort, they often have some manner of padding near the middle, where the strap rests directly against the shoulder or neck. Such items include purses, guitars, rifles, etc. In the case of rifles and other such weaponry, the shoulder strap is usually referred to as a sling. Shoulder straps may also be used in pairs on such items as a backpack or a baby carrier; the straps are worn one over each shoulder, and the item so carried is centred on the back or chest. Some camera strap manufacturers design their straps to fit over both shoulders allowing two cameras to rest at hip level.

The use of such straps frees the hands for other use.

See also

 Shoulder bag (disambiguation)
 Tank top (disambiguation)

Notes and references

Parts of clothing
Sewing
Military uniforms
Armwear

ca:Musclera (indumentària)